Ernest Parkin (1 October 1894 – 1957) was an English professional rugby league footballer who played in the 1910s and 1920s. He played at representative level for Yorkshire, and at club level for Wakefield Trinity (Heritage № 213), as a forward (prior to the specialist positions of), during the era of contested scrums.

Playing career
Parkin made his début for Wakefield Trinity during October 1913, and he played his last match for Wakefield Trinity during March 1924.

County honours
Parkin won cap(s) for Yorkshire while at Wakefield Trinity.

Challenge Cup Final appearances
Parkin played as a forward, i.e. number 12, in Wakefield Trinity's 0-6 defeat by Hull F.C. in the 1914 Challenge Cup Final during the 1913–14 season at Thrum Hall, Halifax, in front of a crowd of 19,000.

References

External links
Search for "Parkin" at rugbyleagueproject.org

1894 births
1957 deaths
English rugby league players
Rugby league forwards
Rugby league players from Wakefield
Wakefield Trinity players
Yorkshire rugby league team players